Lai da Marmorera is a reservoir in the Grisons, Switzerland. It is part of the Parc Ela nature park.

The lake with a surface area of  formed after the completion of the Marmorera dam in 1954 when the old village of Marmorera was flooded. The village was rebuilt above the lake. The 2007 Swiss mystery film Marmorera was filmed in Marmorera and at the dam reservoir.

The lake is flanked on one side by the route of the Julier Pass.

See also
List of lakes of Switzerland
List of mountain lakes of Switzerland

External links

Reservoirs in Switzerland
Lakes of Graubünden
Lakes of the Swiss Alps
RLaidaMarmorera